Granite Gorge is a small downhill ski resort in southwest New Hampshire, United States. The resort is the reincarnation of the former Pinnacle Peak Ski Area, which operated from 1959 to 1977.

It has a  vertical drop, one chairlift (the Pinnacle Express double chairlift), one rope tow, and one magic carpet. The ski area has snowmaking. The  site includes 14 kilometers of cross-country ski trails.

Terrain parks at Granite Gorge include the signature VW bus and the Bag Jump. The resort offers Cosmic Tubing with glow lighting and a DJ on Saturday nights.

References

External links

 NELSAP - "Pinnacle Peak"
 NewEnglandSkiHistory.com - Granite Gorge

Ski areas and resorts in New Hampshire
Tourist attractions in Cheshire County, New Hampshire